Loyalhanna Township is a township in Westmoreland County, Pennsylvania, United States. As of the 2020 census, the township's total population was 2,093.

Geography
According to the United States Census Bureau, the township has a total area of 21.9 square miles (56.7 km), of which 19.9 square miles (51.6 km) is land and 2.0 square miles (5.1 km) is water.  The total area is 8.91% water.

Demographics

At the 2000 census, 2,301 people, 879 households, and 624 families lived in the township. The population density was 115.4 people per square mile (44.6/km). There were 964 housing units at an average density of 48.4/sq mi (18.7/km). The racial makeup of the township was 98.57% White, 0.65% African American, 0.04% Native American, 0.04% Asian, 0.00% Pacific Islander, 0.09% from other races, and 0.61% from two or more races. 0.78% of the population were Hispanic or Latino of any race.
There were 879 households; 32.7% had children under 18 living with them, 57.7% were married couples, 9.3% had a female householder with no husband present, and 29.0% were non-families. 23.4% of households were one person, and 10.1% were one person aged 65 or older. The average household size was 2.62, and the average family size was 3.12.

The age distribution was 25.7% under 18, 7.0% from 18 to 24, 29.6% from 25 to 44, 25.6% from 45 to 64, and 12.0% 65 or older. The median age was 38 years. For every 100 females, there were 104.4 males. For every 100 females aged 18 and over, there were 101.5 males.

The median household income was $33,561, and the median family income was $35,441. Males had a median income of $30,565 versus $22,625 for females. The per capita income for the township was $15,136. 12.6% of the population and 11.0% of families were below the poverty line. 16.4% of those under 18 and 10.4% of those 65 and older lived below the poverty line.

References

Townships in Westmoreland County, Pennsylvania
Pittsburgh metropolitan area
Townships in Pennsylvania